Jéferson Rodrigues Gonçalves (born 15 July 1984), simply Jéferson, is a Brazilian former footballer who played as an attacking midfielder.

Career

Early career
Born in Brasília, Distrito Federal, Jéferson debuted as a professional for Brasiliense. He spent four years at the club after being loaned out to Atlético Goianiense. During his short stay with Atlético Goianiense, Jéferson helped the club gain promotion by winning the Campeonato Goiano da Segunda Divisão.

He later spent time with Guarani, a São Paulo based club, after being transferred to Santo André, where he began the ascent of his playing career and leading the squad to a Campeonato Paulista Série A2 championship and runners-up in the 2008 Campeonato Brasileiro Série B campaign.

Vasco da Gama
Jéferson's role as a playmaker for Santo André caught the attention of more notable Brazilian clubs, in particular, Vasco da Gama, who signed him a year later in 2009. Early on, he struggled to find his place in the squad, due to the bevy of high caliber midfielders at Vasco da Gama. While with Vasco Jéferson enjoyed his best run of form during the Campeonato Carioca, where he made 32 appearances and scored 5 goals.

Avaí
After struggling to win a starting role, he was subsequently loaned to Avaí, a Brazilian club based in Florianópolis, in 2010.  He impressed scoring four goals in his first eight appearances during his short stay with the club.

Sporting Kansas City
On July 17, 2011, Jéferson signed a loan deal with MLS side Sporting Kansas City. The loan deal also stated that he would be signed under the league's Designated Player Rule making him Sporting KC's second Designated Player alongside Omar Bravo. He was waived by the club on November 23, 2011.

Honours
Brasiliense
Campeonato Brasiliense: 2005

Atlético Goianiense
Campeonato Goiano da Segunda Divisão: 2005

Santo André
Campeonato Brasileiro Série B: 2008
Campeonato Paulista Série A2: 2008

Vasco da Gama
Campeonato Brasileiro Série B: 2009
Copa do Brasil: 2011

Avaí
Campeonato Catarinense: 2010

References

External links
Sporting KC profile

Player profile

esporte.ig.com

Living people
1984 births
Footballers from Brasília
Brazilian footballers
Association football midfielders
Brazilian expatriate footballers
Brazilian expatriate sportspeople in the United States
Expatriate soccer players in the United States
CR Vasco da Gama players
Avaí FC players
Sporting Kansas City players
Esporte Clube Bahia players
Atlético Clube Goianiense players
Campeonato Brasileiro Série A players
Major League Soccer players
Designated Players (MLS)